Hemiphractus johnsoni, or the Johnson's horned treefrog, is a species of frog in the family Hemiphractidae. It is endemic to Colombia and known from the Cordillera Central in Antioquia and Caldas Departments as well as from the Cordillera Oriental in Huila Department. Prior to 2001, what now is known as Hemiphractus helioi was included in this species.
Its natural habitat is primary cloud forest. It is threatened by habitat loss.

References

johnsoni
Amphibians of the Andes
Amphibians of Colombia
Endemic fauna of Colombia
Taxonomy articles created by Polbot
Amphibians described in 1917